is a Japanese artist. He is notable as the co-founder of the visual novel, anime development and production enterprise Type-Moon, and for his illustrations on the visual novels, Tsukihime and Fate/stay night, which were adapted into an anime and manga series. He has frequently collaborated with fellow game designer Kinoko Nasu. In 2008, they contributed the special scenario to the Sega/Chunsoft Wii visual novel 428: Shibuya Scramble, which subsequently received a sequel anime titled Canaan. His real name is Tomotaka Takeuchi (竹内 友崇).

Biography 
 Mangaka
Takeuchi originally intended to become a mangaka and in 1996 his manga ‘F’ was awarded an honourable mention at the 3rd Enix 21st Century Manga Grand Prize. In the winter of 1997 his short comic Yuusha-bu tadaima katsudouchuu!! (勇者部ただいま活動中！！) was published in an edition of  but he was unable to establish a regular serial.

Video games
He worked at the video game developer Compile as a CG artist but left the company in 1998 following restructuring. At the recommendation of a former colleague Takeuchi was reemployed at Eighting where he worked as a motion designer for fighting and shooting games.

Doujin circle management
In 1998, Takeuchi formed the doujin circle ‘Takebouki’ with his friend since middle school Kinoko Nasu. With the later addition of Takeuchi’s former colleague and programmer from Compile Kiyobee (清兵衛) and the songwriter Keita Haga (芳賀 敬太), the circle developed into TYPE-MOON. Shortly after work began on TYPE-MOON’s first game Tsukihime, OKSG, who Takeuchi had met on the Takebouki homepage, joined the circle as manager of the website. As Takeuchi was still employed while working on Tsukihime he would work on the game until 4 AM after arriving home. Despite this schedule Takeuchi was able to produce around four hundred images for the game in seven months. While working on Tsukihime Takeuchi lived in Ōta, Tokyo.

Establishing a company
In 2004, Takeuchi established the video game companies, Notes and TYPE-MOON as the main brand under which the games are published, assuming the role of representative.

Characteristics 
 Maid fetish and "Saber face"
Takeuchi is notable for his fondness of maids, and the appearance of maid characters in both Tsukihime and Fate/stay night can be attributed to his tastes. In the TYPE-MOON doujinshi Tsukihime Dokuhon the maid character Hisui is described as being composed almost entirely from Takeuchi’s preferences. Saber from Fate/stay night is especially favoured by Takeuchi and he has since designed a number of characters based on her design. This recurrent character design is popularly referred to as "Saber face".

Self Portrait and Nickname
Takeuchi illustrates himself as a caricature wearing a samue and often smoking when representing himself in TYPE-MOON works. There is a low chance of this portrayal appearing in Melty Blood when Mecha-Hisui is selected, as a nod to his fondness of the character. Within TYPE-MOON, and at doujinshi market events he is referred to with the cute nickname "Take-chan" (武ちゃん) . He is also called "shachō" (社長, company president) by fans.

Inspirations
Takeuchi’s favourite artists are Yasuhiro Nightow, Takami Akai, Shou Tajima, and Yoshihiro Togashi. He has been influenced by the manga Yu Yu Hakusho. During middle school he and his friend Nasu read and were inspired by Ken Ishikawa’s manga adaptation of Makai Tenshō. He is a fan of Shotaro Ishinomori. Takeuchi has been influenced by the work of Takeshi Obata, for example, he used the character Akari Fujisaki from the manga Hikaru no Go as the model for Tsukihime’s Satsuki Yumizuka. Takeuchi has also taken inspiration from anime: Fate/hollow ataraxia’s Caren Hortensia and Bazett Fraga McRemitz were based on Neon Genesis Evangelion’s Rei Ayanami and Wicked City’s Makie respectively. Yoshiaki Kawajiri, and Yoshiyuki Sadamoto are also among his inspirations.

Works

Video games
 Tsukihime (2000) – character design, art, planning, development supervision
 Tsukihime Plus-Disc (2001) – character design, art	
 Kagetsu Tohya (2001) – character design, art, planning, development supervision
 Melty Blood (2002) - character design, art
 Fate/stay night (2004) – character design, art, planning, layout
 Fate/hollow ataraxia (2005) – character design, art, planning
 428: Shibuya Scramble (2008) – bonus scenario character design
 Fate/Extra (2010) – character design supervision
 Witch on the Holy Night (2012) – planning, producer
 Fate/Extra CCC (2013) – original character design 
 Fate/Grand Order (2015) – art direction, character design
 Fate/Extella (2016) – original character design
 Tsukihime -A piece of blue glass moon- (2021)

Novel illustrations
 Kara no Kyoukai (1998-2008)
 Vampire Wars reprint (2004-2005)
 Fate/Zero (2006-2007)
 Eisen Flügel (July 2009-December 2009)

Anime
 Tsukihime, Lunar Legend (2003) – original character design
 Fate/stay night (2006) – original character design, character design supervision, producer, OP 1 storyboard
 Kara no Kyoukai series (2007-2013) – original character design, producer
 Canaan (2009) – Original character design
 Fate/stay night the Movie: Unlimited Blade Works (2010) – original character design, producer
 Fate/Zero (2011-2012) – original character design, producer
 World Conquest Zvezda Plot (2014) – chief producer
 D-Frag! (2014) – episode 1 end card
 Fate/stay night: Unlimited Blade Works (2014-2015) – original character design, producer
 Fate/Grand Order: First Order (2016) – original character design, planning
 Fate/stay night: Heaven's Feel (2017-2020) – original character design, producer
 Fate/Grand Order: Moonlight/Lostroom (2017) – original character design, planning
 Emiya-san Chi no Kyou no Gohan (2018) – planning, producer
 Fate/Grand Order - Absolute Demonic Front: Babylonia (2019) - lead character designer, producer
 Fate/Grand Order - Divine Realm of the Round Table: Camelot (2020) - lead character designer
 Eisen Flügel - original character design (TBA)

Manga
 F
 Yuusha-bu tadaima katsudouchuu!! 
 The Garden of Sinners: Future Gospel

References

External links
TYPE-MOON founders Takashi Takeuchi and Kinoko Nasu's Online Diary 

1973 births
Living people
Japanese illustrators
Manga artists from Chiba Prefecture
People from Yachiyo, Chiba
Type-Moon